Acerentulus is a genus of proturans in the family Acerentomidae.

Species

 Acerentulus alni Szeptycki, 1991
 Acerentulus alpinus Gisin, 1945
 Acerentulus americanus Hilton, 1943
 Acerentulus apuliacus Rusek & Stumpp, 1988
 Acerentulus aubertoti Condé, 1944
 Acerentulus berruezanus Aldaba, 1983
 Acerentulus carpaticus Nosek, 1967
 Acerentulus cassagnaui Nosek, 1969
 Acerentulus catalanus Condé, 1951
 Acerentulus collaris Szeptycki, 1991
 Acerentulus condei Nosek, 1983
 Acerentulus confinis Berlese, 1908
 Acerentulus correzeanus Szeptycki, 1997
 Acerentulus cunhai Condé, 1950
 Acerentulus exiguus Condé, 1944
 Acerentulus gerezianus da Cunha, 1952
 Acerentulus gigas Szeptycki, 1997
 Acerentulus gisini Condé, 1952
 Acerentulus halae Szeptycki, 1997
 Acerentulus insignis Condé, 1945
 Acerentulus keikoae Imadaté, 1988
 Acerentulus kermadecensis Ramsay & Tuxen, 1978
 Acerentulus kisonis Imadaté, 1961
 Acerentulus ladeiroi da Cunha, 1950
 Acerentulus minutus Loksa, 1966
 Acerentulus nemoralis Najt & Vidal Sarmiento, 1970
 Acerentulus occultus Szeptycki, 1979
 Acerentulus ochsenchausenus Rusek, 1988
 Acerentulus omoi Imadaté, 1988
 Acerentulus palissai Nosek, 1967
 Acerentulus proximus Szeptycki, 1997
 Acerentulus rafalskii Szeptycki, 1979
 Acerentulus rapoporti Condé, 1963
 Acerentulus ruseki Nosek, 1967
 Acerentulus seabrai da Cunha, 1952
 Acerentulus setosus Szeptycki, 1993
 Acerentulus sexspinatus Womersley, 1936
 Acerentulus shensiensis Chou & Yang, 1964
 Acerentulus shrubovychae Galli & Capurro, 2013
 Acerentulus silvanus Szeptycki, 1991
 Acerentulus terricola Rusek, 1965
 Acerentulus tolosanus Nosek, 1969
 Acerentulus traegardhi Ionesco, 1937
 Acerentulus tuxeni Rusek, 1966
 Acerentulus xerophilus Szeptycki, 1979

References

Protura